Galicia Hoxe is a Galician digital newspaper from Santiago de Compostela written entirely in Galician. Founded in January 1994, it was formerly called O Correo Galego. It changed its name to Galicia Hoxe in May 2003, and ceased publication on 28 June 2011, due to financial reasons, but remains an active internet news source.

External links
Web site

Mass media in Galicia (Spain)
Galician-language newspapers
Mass media in Santiago de Compostela